aka  is a 2004 Japanese pink film directed by Shinji Imaoka. It was chosen as Best Film of the year at the Pink Grand Prix ceremony.

Synopsis
The film tells the story of Aiko, a 35-year-old mute woman who works in a bowling alley, and her brief romance with Yoshioka, a younger man who works as a postal carrier. The two meet when Aiko accidentally knocks Yoshioka off his bicycle, and they have a sexual encounter soon after. Aiko begins preparing lunchboxes and giving them to Yoshioka at his workplace as a way of expressing affection, which she cannot do verbally. The film ends in tragedy after Yoshioka leaves Aiko.

Cast
 Yumika Hayashi as Aiko Fukui
 Mutsuo Yoshioka as Yoshio Kawada
 Lemon Hanazawa as Ikumi Kato
 Kiyomi Itō as Keiko Chiba
 Takeshi Itō as Ishimoto
 Yōta Kawase as Arima
 Kazunori Sakurai as Matsuo
 Hiroshi Satō as Bowling king

Critical reception
The pink film community awarded Lunchbox top honors at the 2004 Pink Grand Prix. Besides the "Best Film" prize, Shinji Imaoka was given the "Best Director" title, and Yumika Hayashi was judged "Best Actress", and Lemon Hanazawa "Best New Actress" for their work in the film.

Anglophone pink film scholar Jasper Sharp notes that Lunchbox differs from the standard pink film in several technical aspects: the sex scenes are not simulated, the sound recording is live, not post-synced, and Imaoka chose to shoot on 16mm rather than 35mm film. Other than these points, Sharp judges the film typical of director Imaoka's work, which is known for its understatement in portraying relationships among characters on the outskirts of society. Of Lunchbox, he writes, "The intensity of the love scenes and the tenderness of the performances make this work especially one of considerable potency."

Availability

Typical of modern pink films, the film has been given various titles in various releases. 
Originally release theatrically as Lunchbox ("Obento") or Mature Woman: Rutting Ball-Play, on 2 April 2005 the film was released in Japan on DVD under the title Tamamono or "Bowling Ball". The film was also released on DVD in the UK by Salvation. The film has also been seen in international film festivals such as the fourth "Nippon Connection" in Frankfurt in 2004, and the Jeonju International Film Festival in South Korea.

References

External links
 

2004 films
Erotic romance films
Films directed by Shinji Imaoka
1990s Japanese-language films
MILF pornography
Pink films
Shintōhō Eiga films
Films shot in 16 mm film
1990s Japanese films
2000s Japanese films